Scott Nicholas Vincent (born 20 May 1992) is a Zimbabwean professional golfer who plays on the Japan Golf Tour, Asian Tour and LIV Golf. He has won three times on the Japan Golf Tour. In 2022 he won the International Series England on the Asian Tour, as well as the International Series Order of Merit. He represented Zimbabwe in the 2018 World Cup of Golf and the 2020 Tokyo Summer Olympics, being the first Zimbabwean golfer to do so.

Professional career
Vincent turned professional in 2015. After five runner-up finishes on the Asian Tour between 2016–2018, he finally got his first major tour victory at the 2021 Sansan KBC Augusta on the Japan Golf Tour. He also won the ANA Open three weeks later.

In May 2022, Vincent won the Gateway to The Open Mizuno Open, beating Anthony Quayle in a playoff. The win also gained him an exemption into the 2022 Open Championship. A week later, Vincent won the International Series England at Slaley Hall in Northumberland, England. He carded a final-round 66 to win by one shot over Travis Smyth and claim his first Asian Tour victory.

Joining LIV Golf
Vincent's International Series England win gave him the status to play in the 2022 LIV Golf Invitational Series. He played in all eight events, with his best finish being 14th in LIV Golf Invitational Chicago. He played on three different teams before becoming a regular on Joaquín Niemann's Torque GC for the final five tournaments. He finished 42nd on the earnings list with just under $1.5 million in total individual and team earnings. In December 2022, Vincent won the Asian Tour's International Series Order of Merit, earning full status to play in the 2023 LIV Golf League season.

Personal life
He met his wife, Kelsey Loupee, while attending Virginia Tech on a golf scholarship. The pair married in 2017. Loupee acts as his caddy. The pair live in Loupee's hometown of Denver, Colorado. His younger brother; Kieran, is also a professional golfer.

Amateur wins
2014 Players Amateur

Professional wins (5)

Japan Golf Tour wins (3)

Japan Golf Tour playoff record (1–1)

Asian Tour wins (1)

Japan Challenge Tour wins (1)

Results in major championships

CUT = missed the half-way cut

Results in World Golf Championships

"T" = tied

Team appearances
Amateur
Eisenhower Trophy (representing Zimbabwe): 2010, 2012

Professional
World Cup (representing Zimbabwe): 2018

References

External links

Zimbabwean male golfers
Asian Tour golfers
European Tour golfers
LIV Golf players
Olympic golfers of Zimbabwe
Golfers at the 2020 Summer Olympics
Virginia Tech Hokies men's golfers
Sportspeople from Harare
White Zimbabwean sportspeople
Zimbabwean expatriate sportspeople in the United States
1992 births
Living people